"Alma", also known "Alma de Hierro" (Iron Heart), is a song by Colombian musician Fonseca. The song was written by Fonseca, Eduardo Murguia and Mauricio Arriaga for her third studio album, Gratitud (2008), while production was done by Wilfran Castillo. It was released on June 3, 2008, by EMI Capitol as the album's a promotional single. The song is a latin pop and tropipop. The song was used as opening theme of the Mexican soap opera Alma de hierro.

Track listing
Digital download
"Alma" – 4:01

Credits and personnel
Credits adapted from Gratitud liner notes.
Juan Fernando Fonseca – vocals, composer, guitar
J. Eduardo Murguia – composer
Mauricio L. Arriaga – composer, production
Wilfran Castillo – production
Tom Coyne – mastering engineer
Iker Gastaminza – mixing engineer
Boris Milan – mix engineer

References

2008 songs
Fonseca (singer) songs
Songs written by Fonseca (singer)
Spanish-language songs